The Compliance problem is a problem in contractarian ethics. It states that it is in the individuals' best interest to agree to contracts, but not to comply to them.

Thomas Hobbes first outlined the compliance problem in The Leviathan with the character called 'the foole'. His suggested solution was political coercion and oppression.

David Gauthier is the current leading philosopher on the compliance problem. His suggested solution includes the theory of minimax relative concession. 

Social theories